Hohen Viecheln is a municipality in the Nordwestmecklenburg district, in Mecklenburg-Vorpommern, Germany.  It lies on the north shore of Lake Schwerin and about 15 kilometers (about 9.4 miles) south of Wismar.

References

Nordwestmecklenburg